Abhimanyu Rath (1921-1989) was  an Indian politician. He was a Member of Parliament, representing Odisha in the Rajya Sabha the upper house of India's Parliament as a member of the Ganatantra Parishad.

References

Rajya Sabha members from Odisha
1921 births
1989 deaths